Leptocephalus is a genus that was used for species of larval eels, called leptocephali, that were thought to be new fish species, or whose adult eel species were not known. Leptocephali differ so much in appearance from their adults that the larvae and adults of eels are not easily matched, and when first discovered, leptocephali were thought to be a distinct type of fishes, but not eels. Because of this, the genus designation of Leptocephalus was used for a while for unidentified leptocephali even after it was known that these were the larvae of eels thus becoming a "wastebasket taxon", but this practice is no longer used. Examples of marine congrid larvae, found in the western Indian Ocean and the Red Sea that were named this way are listed below. Only two species (L. bellottii and L. ophichthoides) in two families are currently treated as having any validity, though the validity of L. bellottii is strongly in doubt.

Species
There are 16 families of leptocephalus organisms that include over 70 species. They will be broken down according to the species that they contain. If the species has a common name or English name, it will be given after a dash. A common name can belong to many species.

Family Anguillidae

Leptocephalus brevirostris – European eel

Leptocephalus grassii – American eel

Family Chlopsidae

Leptocephalus hyoproroides Strömman, 1896 (valid as Kaupichthys hyoproroides)

Family Colocongridae

Leptocephalus giganteus – giant leptocephalus

Family Congridae

Leptocephalus congroides D'Ancona, 1928 (valid as Heteroconger congroides)

Leptocephalus cotroneii D'Ancona, 1928 (valid as Gorgasia cotroneii)

Leptocephalus ectenurus Jordan & Richardson, 1909 (valid as Rhynchoconger ectenurus)

Leptocephalus erebennus

Leptocephalus inferomaculatus

Leptocephalus nystromi

Leptocephalus trilineatus

Leptocephalus orbignyanus – Argentine conger

Leptocephalus affinis – bandtooth conger

Leptocephalus eckmani – bandtooth conger

Leptocephalus inornatus – bandtooth conger

Leptocephalus marginatus – bandtooth conger

Leptocephalus microphthalmus – bandtooth conger

Leptocephalus rex – bandtooth conger

Leptocephalus taenia – bandtooth conger

Leptocephalus retrotinctus – blackedge conger

Leptocephalus mauritianum – blunt tooth conger

Leptocephalus wilsoni – cape conger

Leptocephalus candidissimus – European conger

Leptocephalus conger – European conger

Leptocephalus gussoni – European conger

Leptocephalus inaequalis – European conger

Leptocephalus lineatus – European conger

Leptocephalus morrisii – European conger

Leptocephalus pellucidus – European conger

Leptocephalus spallanzani – European conger

Leptocephalus stenops – European conger

Leptocephalus vitreus – European conger

Leptocephalus splendens – purple-mouthed conger (valid as Pseudophichthys splendens)

Leptocephalus capensis – Southern Atlantic conger

Leptocephalus maculatus – spotted garden eel

Leptocephalus scheelei – tropical conger

Family Cyprinidae

Leptocephalus mongolicus – Mongolian redfin

Family Derichthyidae

Leptocephalus ingolfianus – duckbill oceanic eel

Leptocephalus anguilloides – narrownecked oceanic eel

Family Eurypharyngidae

Leptocephalus pseudolatissimus – pelican eel

Family Moringuidae

Leptocephalus diptychus – spaghetti eel (valid as Moringua edwardsi)

Leptocephalus tuberculatus – swollengut worm eel

Family Muraenesocidae

Leptocephalus arabicus (valid as Gavialiceps arabicus)

 Family Muraenidae

Leptocephalus euryurus (valid as Anarchias euryurus)

Leptocephalus forsstromi – purplemouth moray eel

Leptocephalus similis – pygmy moray (valid as Anarchias similis)

Family Nemichthyidae

Leptocephalus oxycephalus – avocet snipe eel

Leptocephalus curvirostris – boxer snipe eel

Leptocephalus polymerus – boxer snipe eel

Leptocephalus andreae – slender snipe eel

Leptocephalus canaricus – slender snipe eel

Leptocephalus acuticeps – southern snipe eel

Family Nettastomatidae

Leptocephalus bellottii D'Ancona, 1928 (valid as Nettenchelys bellottii)

Leptocephalus lateromaculatus D'Ancona, 1928 (valid as Saurenchelys lateromaculata)

Leptocephalus saurencheloides

Leptocephalus longirostris – blackfin sorcerer

Leptocephalus urosema – blackfin sorcerer

Leptocephalus oxyrhynchus – Facciola's sorcerer

Leptocephalus stylurus – pillar wire eel

Family Ophichthidae

Leptocephalus echeloides D'Ancona, 1928 (valid as Ophichthus echeloides)

Leptocephalus ophichthoides

Leptocephalus crenatus – key worm eel

Leptocephalus hexastigma – key worm eel

Leptocephalus humilis – key worm eel

Leptocephalus mucronatus – margined snake eel

Leptocephalus undulatus – sharptail snake-eel (valid as Myrichthys breviceps)

Leptocephalus gilberti – sooty eel

Leptocephalus mollis – speckled worm eel

Leptocephalus caudomaculatus – spotted spoon-nose eel

Family Saccopharyngidae

Leptocephalus latissimus (valid as Saccopharynx ampullaceus)

Family Serrivomeridae

Leptocephalus lanceolatus – Bean's sawtooth eel

Leptocephalus lanceolatoides – short-tooth sawpalate

Family Synaphobranchidae

Leptocephalus dolichorhynchus

Leptocephalus proboscideus

Leptocephalus telescopicus – pignosed arrowtooth eel

References

Eels
Obsolete vertebrate taxa